Threadneedle Street is a street in the City of London, England, between Bishopsgate at its northeast end and Bank junction in the southwest. It is one of nine streets that converge at Bank. It lies in the ward of Cornhill.

History
The street is famous as the site of the Bank of England; the bank itself is sometimes known as 'the Old Lady of Threadneedle Street' and has been based at its current location since 1734. The London Stock Exchange was also situated on Threadneedle Street until 2004, when it relocated to nearby Paternoster Square.

Etymology
Some believe that the name originated as Three Needle Street (first attested in 1598), perhaps from a signboard portraying three needles, or from the three needles on the arms of needle-makers who had premises on the street. The threads and needles used by the members of the Worshipful Company of Merchant Taylors is another possibility, since the livery company's hall has been located on Threadneedle Street since 1347. Before 1598, the road was part of Broad Street (now Old Broad Street).

Points of interest
In addition to the Bank of England, there are a number of shops, banks, restaurants and offices located on Threadneedle Street.

The Merchant Taylors' Hall, home of the Worshipful Company of Merchant Taylors, has occupied a site off Threadneedle Street since 1347. It is said that it is here that the British national anthem was sung, in private, in 1607 for the first time, conducted by John Bull.

The headquarters of the South Sea Company was located on the street from 1711 to the 1850s.

The London office of the world's oldest merchant bank, Berenberg Bank, is located at No. 60.

The nearest London Underground station is Bank. London's first bus service ran between Threadneedle Street and Paddington from 1829. Today, the street is served by bus routes 8, 11, 23, 26, 133, 242, and 388.

Over 5000 tonnes of gold bars are held by the Bank of England (both official reserves of the UK Treasury, and others) in a system of eight vaults over two floors under Threadneedle Street.

References

General
 Threadneedle Street, Old and New London: Volume 1 (1878), pp. 531-544.

External links 

Streets in the City of London